The Burning of Kingston, New York, took place on October 16, 1777, during the American Revolutionary War as part of the Saratoga Campaign.

In an attempt to relieve pressure on General John Burgoyne's forces in Saratoga, New York, British units under the command of Henry Clinton attacked and captured Fort Montgomery and Fort Clinton in the Hudson Highlands. Following this battle, Clinton sent forces under the command of John Vaughn to raid the Hudson Valley. Vaughn attacked and burned Kingston, New York, then the capital of New York State, destroying more than 300 buildings. The state government fled to Hurley, New York.

In popular culture
The burning of Kingston is central to the plot of the 1883 novel Rachel Du Mont by Mary Westbrook Van Deusen.

References

Kingston
Kingston
Kingston
Kingston
Burning of Kingston
Kingston
1777 in New York (state)
Kingston, New York